The 2010 IIHF World U18 Championship Division I was an international under-18 ice hockey competition organised by the International Ice Hockey Federation. Both Division I tournaments made up the second level of the 2010 IIHF World U18 Championships. The Group A tournament was played in Herning, Denmark, and the Group B tournament was played in Krynica-Zdrój, Poland. Norway and Germany won the Group A and B tournaments respectively and gained promotion to the Top Division of the 2011 IIHF World U18 Championships.

Group A
The Group A tournament was played in Herning, Denmark, from 12 to 18 April 2010.

Final Standings

 was promoted to Top Division  for the 2011 IIHF World U18 Championships 
 was relegated to Division II for the 2011 IIHF World U18 Championships

Results
All times are local (UTC+2).

Group B
The Group B tournament was played in Krynica-Zdrój, Poland, from 11 to 17 April 2010.

Final Standings

 was promoted to Top Division  for the 2011 IIHF World U18 Championships 
 was relegated to Division II for the 2011 IIHF World U18 Championships

Results
All times are local (UTC+2).

See also
2010 IIHF World U18 Championships
2010 IIHF World U18 Championship Division II
2010 IIHF World U18 Championship Division III

References

External links
 Division IA statistics
 Division IB statistics

2010 IIHF World U18 Championships
IIHF World U18 Championship Division I
International ice hockey competitions hosted by Denmark
International ice hockey competitions hosted by Poland
World